Daniel Mattias Johansson (born 4 August 1980) is a Swedish operatic and concert tenor. He became a hovsångare, or a Swedish "Court Singer", in 2018.

Life

Training 
Johansson was educated at the University College of Opera 2006–2010.

During his studies, he was a soloist at the Sveriges Television "Thirteen-Day Concert 2008" from Berwaldhallen with the Swedish Radio Symphony Orchestra under the direction of Thomas Søndergård. Then, together with Miah Persson, he performed the love duet from  La Bohème  by Giacomo Puccini.

Opera 

Johansson has sung Rodolfo in La Boheme and Hoffmann in The Tales of Hoffmann, both at the Bregenzer Festspiele and The Royal Opera in Stockholm (2011) as well as in Helsinki and Oslo. He has sung Pinkerton in Madama Butterfly at the Royal Opera (2014) and Opera Hedeland in Denmark. He has appeared in the role of Alfredo in La traviata both in Stockholm (2015), in Oslo (2015), at the Opera Hedeland and at the Grand Théâtre de Genève. He has also sung Tamino in The Magic Flute in Valencia, Oslo and Stockholm (2012), and Nemorino in L'elisir d'amore on Dalhalla (2011) and at Göteborgsoperan (2013).

Johansson has been associated with the Norwegian Opera in Oslo and has appeared in roles such as Alfred in Die Fledermaus, Narraboth in Salome, Macduff in Macbeth and Telemaco in Monteverdi's Il ritorno d'Ulisse in patria.

Other engagements include the title role in Faust on Folkoperan and Lensky in performances of  Eugene Onegin at the Norrlandsoperan within the framework of Umeå Kulturhuvudstad 2014 and in Chautauqua County, New York.

Roles

Concert 
Johansson has sung Melot at concert performances of Tristan and Isolde with both the Swedish Radio Symphony Orchestra and conductor Daniel Harding as well as with the Orchestre de Paris and its conductor Christoph Eschenbach.

He introduced himself to a wider audience in 2013, when he, together with several of Sweden's foremost artists, participated in Sweden's Riksdag televised celebration of King Carl XVI Gustaf's 40 years as head of state in Sweden.

Recording 
Johansson can be heard as Magnus Gabriel De la Gardie in Jacopo Foroni's Cristina Regina di Svezia (Sterling) with Göteborgsoperan's orchestra under the direction of Tobias Ringborg.

Prizes and honours 
 Scholarships from the Royal Academy of Music
 2007 – 1st prize in Gösta Winbergh Award
 2012 – .
 2012 – 1st prize and audience prize in Wilhelm Stenhammar International Music Competition.
 2018 – Hovsångare

References

External links 
 

Swedish operatic tenors
1980 births
Living people
People from Växjö Municipality